is a headland at the southernmost tip of the Japanese island of Shikoku, in the city of Tosashimizu, Kōchi Prefecture. The promontory extends into the Pacific Ocean and is situated within Ashizuri-Uwakai National Park. Due to coastal erosion, there are a number of caves around the cape, including , said to be the largest granite cave in the country and a Prefectural Natural Monument.

See also
 List of Places of Scenic Beauty of Japan (Kōchi)
 List of Natural Monuments of Japan (Kōchi)
 Kuroshio Current
 Cape Muroto

References

Tosashimizu, Kōchi
Landforms of Kōchi Prefecture
Ashizuri
Extreme points of Japan